The Scotland cricket team toured Ireland from 8 to 12 September 2014, playing three ODI matches against the Irish team. Ireland won the series 2-1.

Squads

ODI series

1st ODI

2nd ODI

3rd ODI

See also
 2014 Irish cricket season

References

External links

 1st ODI
 3rd ODI
 2nd ODI

2014 in cricket
2014 in Irish cricket
2014 in Scottish cricket
International cricket competitions in 2014